Walter Warren (12 July 1871 – 14 August 1944) was a New Zealand cricketer. He played first-class cricket for Auckland and Wellington between 1894 and 1898.

See also
 List of Auckland representative cricketers

References

External links
 

1871 births
1944 deaths
New Zealand cricketers
Auckland cricketers
Wellington cricketers
Cricketers from Wellington City